The 2017 European Fencing Championships were held in Tbilisi, Georgia from 12 to 17 June 2017 at the Tbilisi Gymnastic Arena.

Schedule

Medal summary

Men's events

Women's events

Medal table

Results

Men

Foil individual

Épée individual

Sabre individual

Foil team

Épée team

Sabre team

Women

Foil individual

Épée individual

Sabre individual

Foil team

Épée team

Sabre team

External links
Official website

European Fencing Championships
European Fencing Championships
International sports competitions hosted by Georgia (country)
European Fencing Championships
Sports competitions in Tbilisi
European Fencing Championships
Fencing in Georgia (country)